The 1951–52 Soviet Championship League season was the sixth season of the Soviet Championship League, the top level of ice hockey in the Soviet Union. 12 teams participated in the league, and VVS MVO Moscow won the championship.

First round

Group A

Group B

Group C

Final round

Championship tiebreaker 
VVS Moscow – CDSA Moscow 3:2

7th-12th place

External links
Season on hockeystars.ru

Soviet League seasons
1951–52 in Soviet ice hockey
Soviet